Communist Workers Organisation (in Dutch: Kommunistische Arbeidersorganisatie  (marxistisch-leninistisch), abbreviated KAO (ml)) was a communist group in the Netherlands. It was founded in March 1978 through the merger of the League of Dutch Marxist-Leninists (BNML), the Communist Workers Organisation (KAO) and the Communist Circle of Breda (marxist-leninist) (KKB (ml)). All of these had their origins in the pro-Chinese faction of the Communist Party of the Netherlands.

The main organ of KAO (ml) was Rode Vlag (Red Flag).

KAO (ml) was active during the Rotterdam port strike of 1979.

KAO (ml) upheld the Three Worlds Theory promoted by the Chinese Communist Party. This eventually led to a split, with one section breaking away and forming the Workers Party of the Netherlands (build-up organisation) (Arbeiderspartij van Nederland (opbouworganisatie)) in 1980.

KAO (ml) dissolved around 1990.

Literature 
 Harmsen, G. (1982): Nederlands Kommunisme. Gebundelde opstellen, Nijmegen, Sun. 
 Vos, Chris (et al.) (2005): De geheime dienst, verhalen over de BVD, Amsterdam, Boom. 

Defunct communist parties in the Netherlands
Political parties established in 1978
1978 establishments in the Netherlands
Political parties disestablished in 1990
1990 disestablishments in the Netherlands